Wilfred Kipkemboi Bungei (born 24 July 1980) is a Kenyan retired Middle-distance runner, who won the 800 m gold medal at the 2008 Summer Olympics in Beijing. He also won at the World indoor Championships in Moscow 2006 the 800 metres title, defeating Mbulaeni Mulaudzi and Olympic Champion Yuriy Borzakovskiy in the course of the race.

Career
Bungei was ranked No.1 in the world over 800 m in 2002 and 2003. He has a personal best of 1:42.34 minutes (Rieti 2002). At the 2001 World Championships in Athletics in Edmonton he won a silver medal over 800 m, finishing behind Andre Bucher.

While in school, he focused on sprints and decathlon, before concentrating on 800 metres running.
He graduated from Samoei High School in 1998. At the 1998 World Junior Championships in Athletics he won a silver medal. Bungei represented his native country at the 2004 Summer Olympics in Athens, Greece.

Bungei is from Kabirirsang, a village near Kapsabet. Several of his relatives are runners, including his brother Sammy Kurgat, who won the 2008 Cologne Marathon. He is a second cousin to Kenyan-born Danish former athlete Wilson Kipketer, while his mum is a cousin of Henry Rono.

Bungei is based near Verona, Italy during track season. He is married to Priscah Bungei with two sons (as of 2008).

He was part of the 4 x 800 metres relay team who currently holds the world record.

References

External links

 
 IAAF Focus on Athletes

1980 births
Living people
People from Nandi County
Kenyan male middle-distance runners
Olympic athletes of Kenya
Olympic gold medalists for Kenya
Athletes (track and field) at the 2004 Summer Olympics
Athletes (track and field) at the 2008 Summer Olympics
Medalists at the 2008 Summer Olympics
World Athletics record holders (relay)
World Athletics Championships medalists
Olympic gold medalists in athletics (track and field)
Goodwill Games medalists in athletics
World Athletics Indoor Championships winners
Competitors at the 2001 Goodwill Games